Pauline Perry may refer to:
 Pauline Perry, Baroness Perry of Southwark, British educator, academic and politician
 Pauline Lesley Perry,South African botanist, horticulturalist and plant collector